This is a list of association football clubs in Solomon Islands.

Teams

Current 
 Auki Kingz
 Avaiki Chiefs Warriors
 Junior Flamingo FC
 K1 United
 Hana F.C.
 Katova FC
 Kohohale FC
 Koloale F.C,
 Kossa F.C.
 Malaita Kingz F.C.
 Marist Fire F.C.
 Northern Warriors FC
 Paratasi FC
 Rangers F.C.
 Real Kakamora F.C.
 Solomon Warriors F.C.
 Sunbeam FC
 Western United FC
 Zome Mars FC

Formerly 
HPF FC
Laugu United FC

Solomon Islands
 
Football clubs
Football clubs